The Women's rugby sevens tournament at the 2015 Pacific Games was held in Port Moresby from 8 to 10 July 2015 at the Sir John Guise Stadium. Fiji won the gold medal defeating Australia by 12–10 in the final. Hosts PNG took the bronze medal defeating New Caledonia 15–0.

Participants
Seven teams played in the tournament:

Squads

Format
The teams played a round-robin followed by play-offs for the medals and fifth place.

Preliminary round

Day 1

Day 2

Day 3

Finals

Fifth place game

Bronze medal final

Gold medal final

See also
 Rugby sevens at the 2015 Pacific Games – Men's tournament
 Rugby sevens at the Pacific Games
 Pacific Games

References

Women
2015 in women's rugby union